The Australian national youth handball team is the national under–18 Handball team of Australia. Controlled by the Australian Handball Federation it represents Australia in international matches.

History

Youth Olympic Games record

Oceania Nations Cup record

World Championship record

References

External links
Official website

Handball in Australia
Men's national youth handball teams
Handball - Youth men's